Geocoridae is a family of big-eyed bugs in the order Hemiptera. There are more than 290 described species in Geocoridae.

Subfamilies and Genera
The Lygaeoidea Species File includes five subfamilies:

Australocorinae
 Australocoris Malipatil, 2012

Bledionotinae
Auth.: Reuter, 1978 all genera:
 Bledionotus Reuter, 1878

Geocorinae

 Apennocoris Montandon, 1907
 Ausogeocoris Malipatil, 2013
 Capitostylus Malipatil, 2013
 Geocoris Fallen, 1814
 Geocoroides Distant, 1918
 Germalus Stål, 1862
 Hypogeocoris Montandon, 1913
 Isthmocoris McAtee, 1914
 Mallocoris Stål, 1872
 Nannogermalus Kóbor & Kondorosy, 2020
 Nesogermalus Bergroth, 1916
 Ninyas Distant, 1882
 Pseudogeocoris Montandon, 1913
 Stenogeocoris Montandon, 1913
 Stenophthalmicus Costa, 1875
 Stylogeocoris Montandon, 1913
 Umbrageocoris Kóbor, 2019
 Unicageocoris Malipatil, 2013

Henestarinae

 Coriantipus Bergroth, 1912
 Engistus Fieber, 1864
 Henestaris Spinola, 1837

Pamphantinae
(Auth. Barber & Bruner, 1933)
tribe Cattarini
 Cattarus Stal, 1858
 Cephalocattarus Slater & Henry, 1999
tribe Epipopolini
 Epipolops Herrich-Schaeffer, 1850
tribe Indopamphantini
 Indopamphantus Malipatil, 2017
 Parapamphantus Barber, 1954
tribe Pamphantini
 Abpamphantus Barber, 1954
 Austropamphantus Slater, 1981
 Cymapamphantus Henry, 2013
 Neopamphantus Barber & Bruner, 1933
 Pamphantus Stål, 1874
 Parapamphantus Barber, 1954
 Tropicoparapamphantus Brailovsky, 1989

References

Further reading

External links

 

Lygaeoidea
Heteroptera families
Articles created by Qbugbot